Everybody's Talkin' 'Bout Miss Thing! is the second album by Lavay Smith & Her Red Hot Skillet Lickers.

Development 
The band worked with David Berger (former director of the Lincoln Center Jazz Orchestra) on the new album. The album differed from One Hour Mama with the addition of six additional horns, and included six original tunes along with the ten covers.

Track listing

Reception 
JazzTimes reported the album to be hot, with all-attitude Smith never failing when working with her backing band. "The Busy Woman's Blues" is reviewed as a mid-tempo smolder-fest. Roberta on the Arts reviewed the album as red hot, visiting the jazz and blues of San Francisco, Kansas City, New York, and New Orleans. Lavay Smith is the vocalist star and is ably backed by her thirteen piece band to create versatile and melodic tunes. The Los Angeles Times reports that Lavay Smith & Her Red Hot Skillet Lickers are not just another swing revival band, but a band making real swing music, jump blues, bebop, New Orleans R&B, and classic jazz. Smith's style harks back to Dinah Washington, using a smoky contralto to dig into the music's timeless essence.

The album is reported to have reached at number 10 on the Billboards Top Jazz Albums chart, and can be shown to have reached at least number 11 on Billboard's Top Jazz Albums chart, on July 1 and July 8, 2000, and number 24 on Billboard's combined Jazz Albums chart on July 1, 2000. Billboard ranked the album as the 25th top jazz album of the year for 2000.

 Personnel Lavay Smith & Her Red Hot Skillet LickersLavay Smith – vocals
Chris Seibert – piano
Charlie Seibert – guitar
Bing Nathan – string bass
Bill Ortiz – trumpets
Allen Smith – trumpets (except tracks 5 & 13)
Danny Armstrong – trombone (except tracks 2, 3, 7, 8)
Marty Wehner – trombone (tracks 2, 3, 7, 8)
Jules Broussard - alto saxophone (tracks 2 - 5, 7, 8, 11, 12, 15), tenor saxophone (1, 6, 9, 10, 13, 14, 16)
Bill Stewart – alto saxophone (tracks 1, 5, 6, 9, 10, 13, 14, 16)
Herman Riley – tenor saxophone (tracks 4, 11, 12, 15)
Ron Stallings – tenor saxophone (track 5), baritone saxophone (except track 5)
Harvey Robb – tenor saxophone (tracks 2, 3, 7, 8)
Sly Randolph – drums (tracks 2, 3, 4, 7, 8, 11, 12, 15)
Mark Lee – drums (tracks 1, 5, 6, 9, 10, 13, 14, 16)
Jesús Diaz – bongos (tracks 6, 16)
Michael Spiro – congas (tracks 6, 16)Production'
Lavay Smith - producer
Chris Seibert – producer, mixing
Mike Cogan – recorded at Bay Records
Dug Nichols, Daryn Roven - recorded at Russian Hill Recording and Different Fur Recording, mixing
Jeremy Goody - assistant engineer
Justin Lieberman - assistant engineer, mixing
Paul Stubblebine - mastering
Kathrin Miller – cover photography
John Borruso – design and artwork

References

External links 

2000 albums